Dragon Rider, also known as Firedrake the Silver Dragon by Netflix, is a 2020 3D computer-animated fantasy film; while officially based on the 1997 novel of the same name by Cornelia Funke, the film takes influence from the How to Train Your Dragon series by Cressida Cowell, with its visuals and marketing based on that of the DreamWorks franchise. The film was due to be released in theatres on 6 August 2020, but due to the COVID-19 pandemic, the film release was postponed until 1 October 2020.

Netflix acquired global distribution rights to the film, and it was released on the streaming platform on 10 September 2021.

Premise
Firedrake is a young silver dragon, who has had enough of constantly having to hide in a wooded valley. He wants to show the older generations of dragons that he is a real dragon. When humans are about to destroy his family's very last refuge, Firedrake secretly sets off on an adventurous journey with Sorrel a bad-tempered cat-like forest brownie. He wants to find the "Rim of Heaven", the dragons' mysterious haven. On their quest, Firedrake and Sorrel encounter Ben, an orphan and stray, who claims to be a dragon rider. While Ben and Firedrake make friends quickly, Sorrel becomes increasingly distrustful and tries her best to get rid of the orphan at every opportunity. But the unlikely trio have to learn to pull together, because they are being hunted by Nettlebrand, an evil dragon-eating monster which was created by an alchemist with the aim of tracking down and destroying every dragon on Earth.

Voice cast
 Thomas Brodie-Sangster as Firedrake
 Felicity Jones as Sorrell
 Freddie Highmore as Ben Greenbloom
 Patrick Stewart as Nettlebrand
 Jimmy Hibbert as Twigleg
 Alex Norton as Gravelbeard
 Nonso Anozie as The Djinn
 Meera Syal as Subisha Gulab
 Sanjeev Bhaskar as Mad Doc

Production
It was announced in June 2017 that production had begun on an animated adaptation of Cornelia Funke's novel. The film is a German-Belgian co-production. The animation was handled by Spain's Able & Baker and Cyborn Studios, while additional parts of the lighting and compositing took place at Rise FX and Big Hug FX. The production work took place in Berlin, Munich and Antwerp.

In May 2018, the castings of Felicity Jones, Patrick Stewart, Freddie Highmore, Thomas Brodie-Sangster, Nonso Anozie, Meera Syal and Sanjeev Bhaskar were announced.

Reception

Box office
Dragon Rider has earned $6,385,553 at the global box office.

Critical response

Robbie Collin of The Daily Telegraph gave it 3 out of 5. Collin said the film borrows heavily from other recent films and wrote: "Dragon Rider is unlikely to spawn many imitators of its own—even if it did, how could anyone tell?—but as a half-term diversion, it ticks every box." Cath Clarke of The Guardian gave it 3 out of 5 and called it a "bland but entertaining family film".

References

External links

 
 

2020 films
2020 3D films
2020 fantasy films
2020 computer-animated films
2020s German animated films
2020s children's adventure films
2020s children's fantasy films
2020s children's animated films
2020s fantasy adventure films
2020s buddy films
2020s English-language films
2020s German-language films
Belgian animated films
Belgian children's films
Belgian adventure films
Belgian animated fantasy films
German 3D films
German computer-animated films
German children's adventure films
German animated fantasy films
German fantasy adventure films
Animal adventure films
Animated adventure films
Animated buddy films
Anime-influenced Western animation
3D animated films
English-language Belgian films
English-language German films
English-language Netflix original films
Animated films based on novels
Films based on German novels
Animated films based on children's books
Animated films about dragons
Animated films about orphans
Animated films about friendship
Fictional trios
Films set in Germany
Films set in forests
Films set in 2020
Films postponed due to the COVID-19 pandemic
Films impacted by the COVID-19 pandemic